This is a collection of temperature conversion formulas and comparisons among eight different temperature scales, several of which have long been obsolete.

Temperatures on scales that either do not share a numeric zero or are nonlinearly related cannot correctly be mathematically equated (related using the symbol =), and thus temperatures on different scales are more correctly described as corresponding (related using the symbol ≘).

Celsius scale

Kelvin scale

Fahrenheit scale

Rankine scale

Delisle scale

Sir Isaac Newton's degree of temperature

Réaumur scale

Rømer scale

Comparison values chart

Comparison of temperature scales

* Normal human body temperature is 36.8 °C ±0.7 °C, or 98.2 °F ±1.3 °F.  The commonly given value 98.6 °F is simply the exact conversion of the nineteenth-century German standard of 37 °C. Since it does not list an acceptable range, it could therefore be said to have excess (invalid) precision.

Some numbers in this table have been rounded.

Graphical representation

Conversion table between the different temperature units

See also
 Degree of frost
 Conversion of units
 Gas mark

Notes and references

Scales of temperature
Conversion of units of measurement